Frankie Edgar (born October 16, 1981) is an American former professional mixed martial artist, who most recently competed in the Bantamweight division of the Ultimate Fighting Championship (UFC). Beginning his career in the Lightweight division, Edgar captured the UFC Lightweight Championship in 2010 and successfully defended it three times before losing it in 2012. Edgar then moved down to compete in the Featherweight division, where he challenged for the UFC Featherweight Championship twice and the interim championship once before moving down to the Bantamweight division in 2020. Edgar's background was in amateur wrestling. He wrestled collegiately for the Clarion University of Pennsylvania, where he was a four-time NCAA Division I National qualifier.

Early life
Edgar was born and raised in Toms River, New Jersey, on October 16, 1981, to Mary (née Annese) and Frank Edgar. He wrestled at Toms River High School East, making it to the New Jersey state championship tournament on three occasions, placing second as a junior and fifth as a senior. He is the oldest of 3 children and went on to compete in the NHSCA Senior Nationals, placing second before he finished high school. Edgar continued wrestling at Clarion University of Pennsylvania, where he qualified for the nationals all four years there. He is also an assistant coach for the Rutgers University wrestling team. Edgar is of predominantly Italian descent, with an Italian-born mother, stepfather and paternal grandfather, but he also has some German ancestry on his biological father's side as well.

Mixed martial arts career

Early career
Edgar entered his first mixed martial arts fight with only a few weeks of training outside of his wrestling background. Edgar originally trained with Rob Guarino of Rhino Fight Team, but today he is part of the Gracie system under Ricardo Almeida in Hamilton, New Jersey, who is part of the Gracie Barra team. Since seventh grade Edgar has wrestled with Steve Rivera at Elite Wrestling NJ in Jackson, New Jersey. His boxing trainer is Mark Henry of Millstone, New Jersey.

Ultimate Fighting Championship
Edgar amassed a 5–0 record before trying out for season five of The Ultimate Fighter. Edgar tried out in front of Ultimate Fighting Championship (UFC) president Dana White and matchmaker Joe Silva, but was not selected to be on the show. However, a month later the UFC contacted Edgar and asked if he would accept a fight with fellow undefeated fighter Tyson Griffin at UFC 67. Griffin caught Edgar in a deep kneebar at the end of the fight, but Edgar refused to tap and lasted out the remainder of the round to win by unanimous decision. The fight has been frequently rebroadcast on UFC Unleashed.

Edgar followed up with a first-round TKO victory over Mark Bocek at UFC 73. He made his main card debut at UFC 78 against veteran fighter Spencer Fisher and won via unanimous decision.

Edgar suffered his first loss at UFC Fight Night 13 against Gray Maynard. This fight marked the first bout of a series. Maynard used his size and wrestling skill to overpower Edgar en route to a unanimous decision. Edgar rebounded with another Fight of the Night victory against Hermes França at UFC Fight Night 14. Edgar then defeated former UFC Lightweight Champion Sean Sherk, outworking him all three rounds to earn the unanimous decision victory over the stronger and heavier fighter.

Edgar was expected to face Kurt Pellegrino on December 5, 2009, at The Ultimate Fighter 10 Finale, but Pellegrino was forced to withdraw due to an injury. Matt Veach was named as Pellegrino's replacement, moving up from an undercard bout. After being on the defensive for most of the first round, Edgar became the aggressor in the second round by punishing Veach with strikes, Ultimately knocking Veach down with a straight right, Edgar then proceeded to take Veach's back and finishing him with a rear naked choke at 2:22 into the second round.

UFC Lightweight Champion
At UFC 112, Edgar was matched against Lightweight Champion B.J. Penn. After a long, back-and-forth, predominantly standing fight, the judges' scorecards were called on for a decision. The scores were (50–45, 49–46 and 48–47) in favor of Edgar. The unanimous decision win awarded him the UFC Lightweight Championship. 8 of 9 media outlets scored the bout in favor of Penn.

On June 24, 2010, ESPN announced Edgar as a nominee for Best Upset of the Year at the 2010 ESPY Awards.

The bout at UFC 112 was deemed close enough that Edgar's first title defense took the form of a UFC 118 rematch against Penn on August 28, 2010. Edgar defeated Penn via unanimous decision to retain the UFC Lightweight Championship, this time with no controversy after taking Penn down multiple times and out-striking him throughout all five rounds. All three judges scored the bout 50–45 for Edgar, making him the second fighter to defeat Penn in the Lightweight division (the other being Jens Pulver) and the second fighter ever to beat Penn twice (the other being Georges St-Pierre).

Edgar's next title defense was against Gray Maynard, the only man to have defeated Edgar, in a rematch from UFC Fight Night 13. Maynard earned the #1 contender spot at UFC 118 with a win over Kenny Florian. The bout took place on January 1, 2011, at UFC 125, with the fight ending in a split draw (48–46 Maynard, 48–46 Edgar and 47–47). In the first round of the bout, Maynard dropped Edgar multiple times, but Edgar would survive. His fight with Maynard marks the third time in UFC history that a championship fight ended as a draw.

During the UFC 125 post-fight press conference, it was announced that Edgar's next opponent would be Anthony Pettis, the final WEC Lightweight Champion. However, less than two hours later UFC president Dana White announced a change of plans. Edgar was then scheduled to fight Gray Maynard for the third time at UFC 130. Dana White confirmed on May 9, 2011, that both Edgar and Maynard had sustained injuries and that their bout was pulled from event. The fight was rescheduled as the main event of UFC 136. After a similar first round to their bout at UFC 125, Edgar won via KO at 3:54 of round 4, earning Knockout of the Night honors.

Edgar faced Benson Henderson on February 26, 2012, at UFC 144.  Henderson defeated Edgar via unanimous decision to become the new UFC Lightweight Champion. Both participants earned Fight of the Night honors for their performance.

A rematch with Henderson took place on August 11, 2012, at UFC 150. In a bout that was very tightly contested, Henderson defeated Edgar again, this time via split decision.

Move to featherweight division
On the August 21, 2012, edition of UFC Tonight it was revealed that Edgar had announced his intentions to move to the featherweight division.

Edgar was briefly linked to a December 2012 bout with Ricardo Lamas, but it was scrapped after Edgar replaced the injured Erik Koch to face champion José Aldo on October 13, 2012, at UFC 153 On September 11, Aldo pulled out of the match with a foot injury.

The bout with Aldo was rescheduled for UFC 156, where Edgar lost to Aldo via a unanimous decision. Both men earned Fight of the Night honors for their performances.

Edgar faced Charles Oliveira on July 6, 2013, at UFC 162 in his first non-title bout since 2009. Edgar won via unanimous decision snapping his three fight losing streak. Both fighters received Fight of the Night honors.

On September 11, 2013, the UFC announced during UFC Tonight, that Edgar would coach against former two-time opponent, B.J. Penn for the 19th season of The Ultimate Fighter. The season aired on Fox Sports 1, and the two coaches faced each other for the third time on July 6, 2014, at The Ultimate Fighter 19 Finale. Edgar won the one-sided bout by TKO in the third round.

Edgar next faced Cub Swanson on November 22, 2014, at UFC Fight Night 57. Edgar dominated the fight and finished Swanson in the fifth round via submission with only 4 seconds left in the fight. The win also earned Edgar his first Performance of the Night bonus award.

A long speculated "superfight" with former WEC Featherweight Champion Urijah Faber took place on May 16, 2015, at UFC Fight Night 66. After speculation as to what weight class the bout was to be contested, either Featherweight, Bantamweight or at a catchweight of somewhere in between, it was announced that the bout would be contested at Featherweight. Edgar won the fight via unanimous decision.

Edgar faced Chad Mendes on December 11, 2015, at The Ultimate Fighter 22 Finale. Edgar won the fight by knockout in the first round.  The win also earned Edgar his second Performance of the Night bonus award.

Edgar next faced José Aldo in a rematch on July 9, 2016, at UFC 200 for the interim UFC Featherweight Championship. Aldo again defeated Edgar via unanimous decision.

Edgar faced Jeremy Stephens on November 12, 2016, at UFC 205. He won the fight via unanimous decision despite being knocked down by a head kick in the second round.

Edgar faced Yair Rodríguez on May 13, 2017, at UFC 211. After a dominant first two rounds, Edgar won the fight via TKO due to doctor stoppage between the second and third rounds due to the swelling on the left eye of Rodríguez. Edgar dedicated this fight to his teammate Nick Catone and his wife Marjorie who lost their baby the same week.

Edgar was scheduled to face Max Holloway on December 2, 2017, at UFC 218; however, on November 8, 2017, he pulled out from the fight, citing injury. The pairing with Holloway was rescheduled and was expected to take place on March 3, 2018, at UFC 222. In turn, Holloway pulled out of this bout on February 3, due to a leg injury and the matchup was scrapped. Edgar eventually faced Brian Ortega on the card. Edgar lost the fight via knockout in the first round, the first stoppage loss of his career.

Edgar faced Cub Swanson in a rematch on April 21, 2018, at UFC Fight Night 128. He won the fight via unanimous decision.

Edgar was scheduled to face Chan Sung Jung on November 10, 2018, at UFC Fight Night 139.  However, it was reported on October 26, 2018 that Edgar was pulled from the bout due to a torn bicep muscle and he was replaced by Yair Rodríguez.

A bout against Max Holloway was scheduled a third time and eventually took place on July 27, 2019 in the main event at UFC 240. Edgar lost the fight via unanimous decision.

Edgar was scheduled to face Cory Sandhagen in a bantamweight bout on January 25, 2020 at UFC Fight Night 166. However, Edgar was removed from that bout in favour of featherweight pairing against Chan Sung Jung a month earlier at UFC on ESPN+ 23 after Jung's original opponent, Brian Ortega, pulled out due to injury. Edgar lost the fight via technical knockout in the first round.

Move to Bantamweight
With one fight left on his contract, Edgar signed a new, multi-fight contract with the UFC. 

Edgar was scheduled to make his bantamweight debut and face Pedro Munhoz on July 15, 2020 at UFC Fight Night 172. However, on July 6, 2020, it was announced that Munhoz was pulled from the bout after testing positive for COVID-19. The pairing was rescheduled and took place on August 22, 2020 at UFC on ESPN 15. Edgar won the back-and-forth fight via split decision. This fight earned him the Fight of the Night award.

Edgar faced Cory Sandhagen at UFC Fight Night 184 on February 6, 2021. He lost the fight via knockout in the opening minute of the fight.

Edgar faced Marlon Vera on November 6, 2021 at UFC 268. After having initial success with his wrestling, Edgar lost the fight via front kick knockout in round three.

Edgar faced Chris Gutiérrez in his retirement fight on November 12, 2022, at UFC 281. He lost the bout after getting knocked out with a knee in the first round.

Career outside UFC

KHK MMA Fight Team
Edgar is signed as a part of KHK MMA Fight Team, a Bahrain-based stable of international and Bahraini fighters financially backed by team founder Khalid bin Hamad Al Khalifa, First Deputy President of the Supreme Council for Youth and Sports in the Kingdom of Bahrain. Bahrain hosted the training camp ahead of his main event clash with Chad Mendes in Las Vegas, Nevada, at the Ultimate Fighter 22 Finale.

Career as commentator
On December 21, 2016, Edgar signed with Brave Combat Federation to make his on-camera debut as a color commentator. His first event commentating was Brave 3: Battle in Brazil, on March 18, 2017. For the occasion, Frankie joined Cyrus Fees, Brave's play-by-play commentator in calling the 10-bout fight card hosted in Curitiba, Brazil.

Personal life
Edgar and his wife, Renee, were married ten days after UFC Fight Night 13. They  have two sons—Francesco (born in January 2009) and Santino James (born in May 2010). They also have one daughter—Valentina (born in June 2014).

Edgar is a resident of Toms River, New Jersey.

Edgar was a featured fighter on True Life: I'm a Mixed Martial Artist leading up to his first fight with Maynard. Edgar appears in all three "UFC Undisputed" video games (2009, 2010, UFC Undisputed 3) and also EA Sports UFC, EA Sports UFC 2, EA Sports UFC 3 and EA Sports UFC 4.

Edgar was featured as a ringside commentator for the third edition of Brave Combat Federation in Curitiba, Brazil.

Championships and accomplishments
 Ultimate Fighting Championship
 UFC Lightweight Championship (One time)
 Three successful title defenses
 Fight of the Night (Eight times) vs. Tyson Griffin, Hermes França, Matt Veach, Gray Maynard, Benson Henderson, José Aldo, Charles Oliveira and Pedro Munhoz
 Knockout of the Night (One time) vs. Gray Maynard
 Performance of the Night (Two times) vs. Cub Swanson and Chad Mendes
 Tied for most Fight of the Night bonuses in UFC history (8) (w. Nate Diaz, Edson Barboza & Dustin Poirier)
 Second longest total fight time in UFC history (7:57:10)
 Reality Fighting
 Reality Fighting Lightweight Championship (One time)
 One successful title defense

 Sherdog
 Fight of the Year (2011) vs. Gray Maynard on January 1
 2011 All-Violence Second Team
 2014 All-Violence First Team
 2017 Beatdown of the Year vs. Yair Rodríguez
 World MMA Awards
 2011 Fight of the Year vs. Gray Maynard at UFC 125
 ESPN
 2012 Fight of the Year vs. Benson Henderson at UFC 144

Mixed martial arts record 

|-
|Loss
|align=center|
|Chris Gutiérrez
|KO (knee)
|UFC 281
| 
|align=center|1
|align=center|2:01
|New York City, New York, United States
|
|-
|Loss
|align=center|
|Marlon Vera
|KO (front kick)
|UFC 268
|
|align=center|3
|align=center|3:50
|New York City, New York, United States
|
|-
|Loss
|align=center|24–9–1
|Cory Sandhagen
|KO (flying knee)
|UFC Fight Night: Overeem vs. Volkov
|
|align=center|1
|align=center|0:28
|Las Vegas, Nevada, United States
|
|-
|Win
|align=center|24–8–1
|Pedro Munhoz
|Decision (split)
|UFC on ESPN: Munhoz vs. Edgar
|
|align=center|5
|align=center|5:00
|Las Vegas, Nevada, United States
|
|-
|Loss
|align=center|23–8–1
|Jung Chan-sung
|TKO (punches)
|UFC Fight Night: Edgar vs. The Korean Zombie 
|
|align=center|1
|align=center|3:18
|Busan, South Korea
|
|-
|Loss
|align=center|23–7–1
|Max Holloway
|Decision (unanimous)
|UFC 240 
|
|align=center|5
|align=center|5:00
|Edmonton, Alberta, Canada
|
|- 
|Win
|align=center|23–6–1
|Cub Swanson
|Decision (unanimous)
|UFC Fight Night: Barboza vs. Lee
|
|align=center|3
|align=center|5:00
|Atlantic City, New Jersey, United States
|
|- 
|Loss
|align=center|22–6–1
|Brian Ortega
|KO (punch)
|UFC 222 
|
|align=center|1
|align=center|4:44
|Las Vegas, Nevada, United States
| 
|-
|Win
|align=center|22–5–1
|Yair Rodríguez
|TKO (doctor stoppage)
|UFC 211
|
|align=center|2
|align=center|5:00
|Dallas, Texas, United States
|
|-
|Win
|align=center|21–5–1
|Jeremy Stephens
|Decision (unanimous)
|UFC 205
|
|align=center|3
|align=center|5:00
|New York City, New York, United States
|
|-
|Loss
|align=center|20–5–1
|José Aldo
|Decision (unanimous)
|UFC 200
|
|align=center|5
|align=center|5:00
|Las Vegas, Nevada, United States
|
|-
|Win
|align=center|20–4–1
|Chad Mendes
|KO (punch)
|The Ultimate Fighter: Team McGregor vs. Team Faber Finale
|
|align=center|1
|align=center|2:28
|Las Vegas, Nevada, United States
|  
|-
|Win
|align=center|19–4–1
|Urijah Faber
|Decision (unanimous)
|UFC Fight Night: Edgar vs. Faber
|
|align=center|5
|align=center|5:00
|Pasay, Philippines
|
|-
|  Win
|align=center| 18–4–1
| Cub Swanson
| Submission (neck crank)
| UFC Fight Night: Edgar vs. Swanson
| 
| align=center| 5
| align=center| 4:56
| Austin, Texas, United States
| 
|-
| Win
|align=center| 17–4–1
| B.J. Penn
| TKO (punches)
| The Ultimate Fighter: Team Edgar vs. Team Penn Finale
| 
| align=center| 3
| align=center| 4:16
| Las Vegas, Nevada, United States
| 
|-
| Win
|align=center| 16–4–1
| Charles Oliveira
|  Decision (unanimous)
| UFC 162
| 
|align=center| 3
|align=center| 5:00
| Las Vegas, Nevada, United States
| 
|-
| Loss
|align=center| 15–4–1
| José Aldo
| Decision (unanimous)
| UFC 156
| 
|align=center| 5
|align=center| 5:00
| Las Vegas, Nevada, United States
| 
|-
| Loss
|align=center| 15–3–1
| Benson Henderson
| Decision (split)
| UFC 150
| 
|align=center| 5
|align=center| 5:00
| Denver, Colorado, United States
| 
|-
| Loss
|align=center| 15–2–1
| Benson Henderson
| Decision (unanimous)
| UFC 144
| 
|align=center| 5
|align=center| 5:00
| Saitama, Japan
|  
|-
| Win
|align=center| 15–1–1
| Gray Maynard
| KO (punches)
| UFC 136
| 
|align=center| 4
|align=center| 3:54
| Houston, Texas, United States
| 
|-
| Draw
|align=center| 
|  Gray Maynard
| Draw (split)
| UFC 125
| 
|align=center| 5
|align=center| 5:00
| Las Vegas, Nevada, United States
| 
|-
| Win
|align=center| 14–1
| B.J. Penn
| Decision (unanimous)
| UFC 118
| 
|align=center| 5
|align=center| 5:00
| Boston, Massachusetts, United States
|  
|-
| Win
|align=center| 13–1
| B.J. Penn
| Decision (unanimous)
| UFC 112
| 
|align=center| 5
|align=center| 5:00
| Abu Dhabi, United Arab Emirates
| 
|-
| Win
|align=center| 12–1
| Matt Veach
| Submission (rear-naked choke)
| The Ultimate Fighter: Heavyweights Finale
| 
|align=center| 2
|align=center| 2:22
| Las Vegas, Nevada, United States
| 
|-
| Win
|align=center| 11–1
| Sean Sherk
| Decision (unanimous)
| UFC 98
| 
|align=center| 3
|align=center| 5:00
| Las Vegas, Nevada, United States
| 
|-
| Win
|align=center| 10–1
| Hermes França
| Decision (unanimous)
| UFC Fight Night: Silva vs. Irvin
| 
|align=center| 3
|align=center| 5:00
| Las Vegas, Nevada, United States
| 
|-
| Loss
|align=center| 9–1
| Gray Maynard
| Decision (unanimous)
| UFC Fight Night: Florian vs. Lauzon
| 
|align=center| 3
|align=center| 5:00
| Broomfield, Colorado, United States
| 
|-
| Win
|align=center| 9–0
| Spencer Fisher
| Decision (unanimous)
| UFC 78
| 
|align=center| 3
|align=center| 5:00
| Newark, New Jersey, United States
| 
|-
| Win
|align=center| 8–0
| Mark Bocek
| TKO (punches)
| UFC 73
| 
|align=center| 1
|align=center| 4:55
| Sacramento, California, United States
| 
|-
| Win
|align=center| 7–0
| Tyson Griffin
| Decision (unanimous)
| UFC 67
| 
|align=center| 3
|align=center| 5:00
| Las Vegas, Nevada, United States
| 
|-
| Win
|align=center| 6–0
| Jim Miller
| Decision (unanimous)
| Reality Fighting 14
| 
|align=center| 3
|align=center| 5:00
| Atlantic City, New Jersey, United States
|
|-
| Win
|align=center| 5–0
| Deividas Taurosevičius
| Decision (unanimous)
| Reality Fighting 13: Battle at the Beach
| 
|align=center| 3
|align=center| 5:00
| Wildwood, New Jersey, United States
| 
|-
| Win
|align=center| 4–0
| Steve McCabe
| Submission (guillotine choke)
| Ring of Combat 10
| 
|align=center| 1
|align=center| 2:37
| Atlantic City, New Jersey, United States
| 
|-
| Win
|align=center| 3–0
|  Jerome Isip
| Technical Submission (rear-naked choke)
| SportFighting 2
| 
|align=center| 1
|align=center| 3:26
| Hoboken, New Jersey, United States
| 
|-
| Win
|align=center| 2–0
| Mark Getto
| TKO (punches)
| Ring of Combat 9
| 
|align=center| 1
|align=center| 4:21
| Asbury Park, New Jersey, United States
|
|-
| Win
|align=center| 1–0
| Eric Uresk
| TKO (punches)
| Underground Combat League
| 
|align=center| 1
|align=center| 3:38
| The Bronx, New York, United States
|
|-
|}

NCAA record

! colspan="8"| NCAA Championships Matches
|-
!  Res.
!  Record
!  Opponent
!  Score
!  Date
!  Event
|-
! style=background:white colspan=6 |2005 NCAA Championships at 141 lbs
|-
|Loss
|2–6
|align=left|Casio Pero
|style="font-size:88%"|4–6 OT
|style="font-size:88%" rowspan=4|March 18, 2005
|style="font-size:88%" rowspan=4|2005 NCAA Division I Wrestling Championships
|-
|Loss
|2–5
|align=left|Nate Gallick
|style="font-size:88%"|5–10
|-
|Win
|2–4
|align=left|Ronald Tarquinio
|style="font-size:88%"|4–2
|-
|Win
|1–4
|align=left|Alex Tsirtsis
|style="font-size:88%"|Major 10–2
|-
! style=background:white colspan=6 |2004 NCAA Championships at 141 lbs
|-
|Loss
|0–4
|align=left|Cory Cooperman
|style="font-size:88%"|Major 3–12
|style="font-size:88%" rowspan=2|March 18, 2004
|style="font-size:88%" rowspan=2|2004 NCAA Division I Wrestling Championship
|-
|Loss
|0–3
|align=left|Doug McGraw
|style="font-size:88%"|3–4
|-
! style=background:white colspan=6 |2003 NCAA Championships at 141 lbs
|-
|Loss
|0–2
|align=left|Ronaldo Tarquinio
|style="font-size:88%"|3–5
|style="font-size:88%" rowspan=2|March 20, 2003
|style="font-size:88%" rowspan=2|2003 NCAA Division I Wrestling Championship
|-
|Loss
|0–1
|align=left|Jason Mester
|style="font-size:88%"|2–3
|-

Pay-per-view bouts

See also

 List of current UFC fighters
 List of male mixed martial artists

References

External links
 
 

1981 births
Living people
American male mixed martial artists
Featherweight mixed martial artists
Lightweight mixed martial artists
American people of Italian descent
American people of German descent
American Muay Thai practitioners
Mixed martial artists utilizing Muay Thai
Mixed martial artists utilizing boxing
Mixed martial artists utilizing collegiate wrestling
Mixed martial artists utilizing Brazilian jiu-jitsu
Ultimate Fighting Championship champions
Ultimate Fighting Championship male fighters
Mixed martial artists from New Jersey
People from Ocean County, New Jersey
Sportspeople from Toms River, New Jersey
Toms River High School East alumni
People awarded a black belt in Brazilian jiu-jitsu
American practitioners of Brazilian jiu-jitsu